Diana Patricia Hall is an Australian former soccer player who represented the Australia women's national soccer team four times in 1979 and 1980.

References

Living people
Australian women's soccer players
Women's association football defenders
Year of birth missing (living people)